Alice Yen-Ping Ting is Taiwanese-born American chemist. She is a professor of Genetics, of Biology, and by courtesy, of Chemistry at Stanford University. She is also a Chan Zuckerberg Biohub investigator.

Early life and education 
Alice Ting was born in Taiwan and immigrated to the United States when she was three years old.  She was raised in Texas and attended the Texas Academy of Mathematics and Science (TAMS). She received her B.S. in Chemistry from Harvard University in 1996, working with Nobel laureate E.J. Corey. She completed her Ph.D. with Peter G. Schultz at the University of California, Berkeley in 2000.

Ting completed her postdoctoral fellowship with 2008 Nobel Laureate Roger Y. Tsien.

Career
Ting joined the MIT Chemistry Department in 2002 where she was the Ellen Swallow Richards Professor until 2016.  In 2016, she moved to Stanford University, Departments of Genetics, of Biology, and, by courtesy, of Chemistry.  Her research harnesses the power of directed evolution and synthetic organic chemistry to develop novel methods for studying the cell.  She has received a number of awards, including a 2008 NIH Director's Pioneer Award, a 2010 Arthur C. Cope Scholar Award from the American Chemical Society, an NIH Transformative R01 Award (both 2013 and 2018), the McKnight Technological Innovations in Neuroscience Award, the Technology Review TR35 Award, the Sloan Foundation Research Fellowship, the Office of Naval Research Young Investigator Award, the Camille Dreyfus Teacher-Scholar Award, and the Vilcek Prize for Creative Promise in Biomedical Science in 2012. Ting has been an investigator of the Chan Zuckerberg Biohub since 2017.

Research 
Ting and her lab are credited with developing several influential techniques, some of which have been broadly adopted by academic and industrial researchers across the world. Proximity labeling (PL) is a method for discovery of molecules that reside within a few nanometers (1-5 nm) of a designated molecule of interest, within living cells or organisms. The technique involves fusing a promiscuous labeling enzyme to the molecule of interest and then adding a small-molecule substrate that enables the enzyme to covalently tag any (protein or RNA) molecule within its immediate vicinity. PL is a powerful method for elucidating signaling networks, dissecting molecular function, and potentially discovering novel disease genes. Ting's laboratory has developed three widely used enzymes for PL; all were engineered using directed evolution: the peroxidase APEX2, and the biotin ligases TurboID and miniTurbo.

In addition, Ting and her lab developed monovalent streptavidin, site-specific biotinylation in mammalian cells, small monovalent quantum dots for single molecule imaging, APEX2 as a genetic tag for electron microscopy (analogous to green fluorescent protein but visible by electron microscopy), split horseradish peroxidase for visualization of synapses in vivo, FLARE (fast light- and activity-regulated expression) for gaining genetic access to activated neural ensembles, SPARK (specific protein association tool giving transcriptional readout with rapid kinetics) for transcriptional readout of protein-protein interactions, and PRIME (probe incorporation mediated by enzymes) – a protein labeling technique that enables scientists to capitalize on the brightness, photostability, small size, and chemical diversity of small-molecule probes as an alternative to green fluorescent protein.

References

External links
 TR35
 Ting Laboratory website at Stanford
 

American women chemists
Harvard College alumni
Living people
Massachusetts Institute of Technology School of Science faculty
Organic chemists
Taiwanese emigrants to the United States
University of California, Berkeley alumni
Taiwanese chemists
Stanford University Department of Chemistry faculty
Year of birth missing (living people)
21st-century American women